This article presents a detailed timeline of the history of the Republic of Venice from its legendary foundation to its collapse under the efforts of Napoleon.

5th century

421:  On Friday 25 March “at the stroke of noon” Venice is founded according to legend by three consuls from Padua, with the establishment of a trading-post on the islands of the Rialto and a church dedicated to St. James.
452 – Attila the Hun, from central Asia, invades Italy and sacks Aquileia
466 – Representatives of the island communities meet in Grado to work out a rudimentary system of self-government through 12 tribunes elected annually.
476 – Fall of the Western Roman Empire, after the deposition of Romulus Augustulus by Odoacer, a military leader in Italy of east German descent.
493 – Odoacer is overthrown by Theodoric the Great, an Arian Christian who had received his education in Constantinople.

6th century
535 – Byzantine Emperor Justinian I launches the campaign which will become the Gothic War (535–554) for the re-conquest of Italy
539 – Ravenna is re-taken by the Emperor.  The association of island communities and Istria are part of the Byzantine Empire
567 – The Exarchate of Italy is established, based in Ravenna with a tribune appointed to rule over maritime Venice
568 – Lombard, a Germanic tribe from the region of Hungary, invades Italy under King Alboin.  Great numbers of refugees flee to the lagoons
Bishop Paul of Altino hears “a voice from heaven” commanding him to climb to the top of a nearby tower and look to the stars for the path to where he must take his flock. They lead him to an island in the centre of the lagoon, later named Torcello “little tower” in memory of the one the bishop had climbed.
The people of Aquileia and their archbishop take refuge on the island of Grado.  The See of Aquileia was traditionally founded by St. Mark the Evangelist, so its transferral is significant. The bishop thereafter bears the title of Patriarch of Grado
The people of Concordia Sagittaria flee to Caorle
The people of Padua choose Malamocco

7th century
639 – Lombards capture Oderzo whose inhabitants flee to Cittanova which is renamed Heraclea in honor of the Byzantine Emperor
697 – According to legend, a general assembly of all the peoples of the lagoons is called to Heraclea by the Patriarch of Grado and elects a single ruler in place of the twelve tribunes – Paolo Lucio Anafesto – who is most probably Paul, the Exarch of Ravenna
This same year the newly erected Basilica of Santa Maria Assunta on the island of Torcello is consecrated.

8th century
712 – King Liutprand of the Lombards occupies Ravenna but loses it to the Byzantines
726 – Byzantine Emperor Leo III orders the destruction of icons The lagoon communities rise up in rebellion.
726 or 727 – Paul, Exarch of Ravenna, is assassinated; according to legend, so is the provincial governor Marcello. Orso from Eraclea is elected chief of the 12 tribunes.  He is given the title of “dux” (which becomes "doge" in the local dialect).  Orso is the first sovereign Doge of Venice (the third according to the legendary list which began in 697), having received the title “Ipato” or Consul by the Byzantine Emperor
737 – Assassination of Doge Orso Ipato and beginning of the five year “Interregnum”
742 – Teodato Ipato, Doge Orso Ipato’s son, is elected to be the nextDoge.  He transfers his seat of government from Heraclea to Malamocco on the Lido which is thought to be more easily defended. He rules as a sovereign
751 - 
Fall of Ravenna by the Lombards under King Aistulf ends the Exarchate of Ravenna  The Exarch himself is killed.
The last Frankish Merovingian monarch, Childeric III, is deposed and the Carolingian Pepin the Short is elected King
753 – Pepin the Short, son of Charles Martel (and the father of Charlemagne) invades Italy at the invitation of Pope Stephen II
755 – Doge Teodato Ipato is deposed and blinded by his successor, Doge Galla Gaulo
756
Doge Galla Gaulo is deposed and blinded by Doge Domenico Monegario
The Francs, having driven out the Lombards, donate the territory of Ravenna to the Pope who claims the Exarch for himself.
764
In order to maintain necessary good relations with both the Byzantine Empire and the Franks, two tribunes are elected annually to limit ducal power. Doge Domenico Monegario, who becomes resentful of the two tribunes, is deposed, blinded, and exiled
Doge Maurizio Galbaio, a well-born Heraclean who claims to descend from the Emperor Galba, is elected Doge
778 – Doge Maurizio Galbaio associates his son Giovanni with him in the Dogeship, thus allowing him to succeed his father without popular sanction or approval of his subjects
c.780 – The Rialto Islands gradually become permanently settled, and on the island of Olivolo (modern-day Isola di San Pietro di Castello) the chapel of Saints Bacchus and Sergius is rebuilt and reconsecrated as the cathedral of St. Peter.  It remained the cathedral of Venice for a thousand years, until the City was occupied by Napoleon at the end of the eighteenth century.
Doge Maurizio Galbaio appoints his sixteen-year-old nephew Christopher bishop of Olivolo, but when the Patriarch of Grado refuses to consecrate him a flotilla of ships is sent to attack Grado, and there the elderly Patriarch of Grado is thrown to his death from a tower. The new Patriarch of Grado, Fortunatus, flees in exile to the court of Charlemagne at Aachen

9th century
803 – Opposition to the Galbaii family forces Doge Giovanni Galbaio, with his son Christopher to flee to Mantua
804
Obelerio degli Antenori is elected Doge and immediately associates his brother Beato to the Dogeship
The exiled Patriarch of Grado, Fortunatus, returns to Venice from the court of Charlemagne at Aachen and proposes that, in return for his being re-instated at Grado, and the Doge’s acceptance of the authority of Charlemagne (who was crowned Emperor of the West by the Pope on Xmas Day AD 800) the Venetians could count on the protection of the Franks when needed. Doge Obelerio degli Antenori accepts.
805
25 December (Christmas Day) – Doge Obelerio degli Antenori and his brother Beato do homage to Charlemagne in Aachen
Doge Obelerio degli Antenori chooses a Frankish bride; Carola, the first Dogaressa
809
Venetian recognition of Charlemagne as Emperor of the West is seen as treachery by the Eastern Emperor in Constantinople and a Byzantine fleet sails up the Adriatic and attacks a Frankish flotilla at the port of Comacchio situated to the south of the Venetian Lagoon.  It is defeated.
Doge Obelerio and his brother Beato raise yet another brother, Valentino, to the Dogeship alongside them. It is one step too much for the Venetian people who rise up in opposition against them. Obelerio calls upon Charlemagne’s son King Pepin of Italy installed at Ravenna to intervene on their behalf, as had been promised by the agreement of 804.
810
King Pepin of Italy with his army and cavalry sets out from his capital Ravenna to invade the Venetian capital Malamocco, situated on the Lido.  But the inhabitants of the lagoon put up fierce resistance under the leadership of Agnello Participazio from Rialto.  The siege lasts six months and Pepin's army is ravaged by the diseases of the local swamps and forced to withdraw.  A few months later Pepin dies
Doge Obelerio is deposed, and Agnello Participazio, who has defended Venice from the beginning, is chosen to replace him.
Former Doge Obelerio degli Antenori spends the next two decades in exile in Constantinople
811 – Agnello Participazio is the eighth Venetian to hold the title of Doge.  His Rialtine house on the present Campiello del Cason becomes the first Doge's Palace within the Venice we know today, soon to be rebuilt in stone next to the chapel of Saint Theodore which stood on the site now occupied by the Basilica of Saint Mark.
827 – Giustiniano Participazio is elected Doge
828 – Relics of Saint Mark the Evangelist arrive in Venice having been stolen from Alexandria in Egypt by the merchants Bono da Malamocco and Rustico da Torcello
829 – Giovanni I Participazio arrested, and tonsured (head shaved like monk)
832 – Former Doge Obelerio degli Antenori returns from two decades of exile in Constantinople with a band of faithful men to reclaim the Dogeship. He lands at Vigilia, near Malamocco, but the legitimate Doge, Giovanni Participazio, razes the two cities and kills Obelerio degli Antenori displaying his head in the market
837 – Pietro Gradonico assassinated, although in this case his successor arrests and executes the assassins
839 – The Venetian Navy conducts military operations against Croats, led by Mislav of Croatia, who sign a peace treaty with doge Pietro Tradonico
840 – Pietro's military assault on the Narentines fails
841 – The Republic of Venice sends a fleet of 60 galleys (each carrying 200 men) to assist the Byzantines in driving the Arabs from Crotone, but fail
846 – The Narentines breach Venice itself, and raid the neighbouring lagoon city of Caorle
864 – Orso I Participazio is elected Doge
881 – Giovanni II Participazio resigns due to poor health
887 – Narentines defeated Venetians near the town of Makarska, killing the Venetian doge Pietro I Candiano in open battle. Venetians start paying prince Branimir (879–892), an annual tribute for the right to travel and trade in the Adriatic Sea
888 – Pietro Tribuno is elected Doge

10th century
912 – Orso II Participazio is elected Doge
932 – Pietro II Candiano is elected Doge
939 – Pietro Participazio is elected Doge
942 – Pietro III Candiano is elected Doge
948 – With the weakening of Byzantium, Venice began to see Ragusa as a rival who needed to be brought under her control, but the attempt to conquer the city failed
959 - Pietro IV Candiano is locked in his palace with his son while it burned.
976 - Pietro I Orseolo  resigned to become a Camaldolese hermit in Abbey of Sant Miguel de Cuxa in the Pyrenees
978 - Vitale Candiano is elected Doge
979 – Tribuno Memmo is elected Doge
991 – Pietro II Orseolo gave the majority of his wealth to the poor and the Church, and retired to a monastery
996 – Venetian Doge Pietro II Orseolo stop to pay tribute to the Narentine Pirates, after several incursion in the Venetian cities.

11th century
1000 – A powerful fleet move to Istria and Dalmatia commanded by Doge Pietro II Orseolo to secured the Venetian fight Narentine pirates, who were suppressed permanently. The bloodiest armed conflict during the expedition was the battle of Lastovo 
1009 – Otto Orseolo arrested, beard shaved, and banished to Constantinople for nepotism. He was the father of King Peter Urseolo of Hungary.
1026 – Pietro Barbolano abdicated under heavy pressure to reinstate Otto Orseolo
1032 – Domenico Flabanico is elected Doge
1043 – Domenico Contarini is elected Doge
1071 – Domenico Selvo is elected Doge
1082 – Needing Venetian naval assistance, the Byzantine emperor Alexios I Komnenos grants them major trading concessions within his Empire in a chrysobull
1084
Domenico Selvo personally leads a fleet against the Normans, but is defeated and loses 9 great galleys, the largest and most heavily armed ships in the Venetian war fleet. He is deposed the same year by popular revolt to a monastery where he dies three years later
Vitale Faliero is elected Doge
1099 – St Mark's Basilica is consecrated in the presence of the Holy Roman Emperor Henry IV
1096
First Crusade begins
Vitale I Michiel is elected Doge

12th century
1102 – Ordelafo Faliero is elected Doge
1104 – Traditional date for commencement of construction of the permanent Arsenale
1105 – Great fire of Venice
1110 – Ordelafo Faliero personally commands a Venetian fleet of 100 ships to assist Baldwin I of Jerusalem in capturing the city of Sidon
1116: July 15 – Doge Ordelafo Faliero conquers the troops of Stephen II of Hungary who have arrived to relieve Zara and the remaining towns of Dalmatia surrender to Venice
1117 – Stephen II of Hungary regains Dalmatia while the Venetians are on a naval expedition, Doge Ordelafo Faliero dying in battle near Zara; Domenico Michele is elected Doge to succeed him, reconquers the territory and agrees a 5-year truce
1122 – Byzantine emperor John II Komnenos refuses to renew the trading rights granted by Alexios I in 1082. The Venetian fleet raids the Greek coasts in retaliation, until the rights are re-confirmed in 1125
1130 – Pietro Polani is elected Doge
1143 – The Commune Veneciarum is founded
1148 – Domenico Morosini is elected Doge
1156 – Vital II Michele is elected Doge
1171 – The Byzantine emperor Manuel I Komnenos expels all Venetians from Constantinople. Outbreak of a war that continues inconclusively until relations normalize ca. 1180
1172
The Maggior Consiglio – the Great Council of Venice – is founded
Sebastiano Ziani is elected Doge
1177 – Pope Alexander III is reconciled with Emperor Frederick Barbarossa in the Basilica of St. Mark thanks to the intercession of Doge Sebastiano Ziani
1178 – Orio Mastropiero is elected Doge
1182 – Massacre of the Latins in Constantinople
1183 – The Dalmatian city of Zara (Zadar) rebels against Venetian rule
1192 – Enrico Dandolo is elected Doge and is the first Doge to make the promissione ducale

13th century
1202: 23 November – During the Fourth Crusade, crusader and Venetians reconquered Zara. Unable to raise enough funds to pay to their Venetian contractors, the crusaders agree to reconquer the city
1203 – The Fourth Crusade is diverted towards the Byzantine capital, Constantinople, under the request of the Byzantine Emperor
1204: April – Sack of Constantinople by the crusaders and Venetians conquered Constantinople, the Byzantine Empire is succeeded by the Latin Empire (Partitio terrarum imperii Romaniae), Venice emerges has great benefits. Doge Enrico Dandolo obtains the title of Lord of a Quarter and Half a Quarter of the Roman Empire. Venice seizes the Horses of Saint Mark
1205
Pietro Ziani is elected Doge
1211 – The island of Candia (Crete) is annexed to Venice
1229
Jacopo Tiepolo is elected Doge
 The founding of the Consiglio dei Pregadi (Senate)
1249 – Marino Morosini is elected Doge
1252 – Reniero Zeno is elected Doge
1256 – Outbreak of the first war against Genoa, the "War of Saint Sabas", which lasts until 1270
1261 – Reconquest of Constantinople by the Byzantine Greek Empire of Nicaea and re-establishment of the Byzantine Empire
1263 – Venetian victory against the Genoese and Byzantines at the Battle of Settepozzi
1264 – The Genoese capture a Venetian trade convoy at the Battle of Saseno.
1266 – Venetian victory against the Genoese at the Battle of Trapani
1268
 Lorenzo Tiepolo is elected Doge
 A ten-year peace treaty with Byzantium grants Venice trading privileges.
1271 – Marco Polo leaves for Cathay
1275 – Jacopo Contarini is elected Doge
1277 – A two-year peace treaty with Byzantium grants Venice trading quarters in Constantinople and Thessalonica.
1280 – Giovanni Dandolo is elected Doge
1284 – First gold ducat is minted, which is to be known as the zecchino beginning in 1554
1289 – Pietro Gradenigo is elected Doge
1294 – Renewal of hostilities with Genoa, which last until 1299
1295
Return of Marco Polo from Cathay
Pietro Gradenigo sent a fleet of 68 ships to attack a Genoese fleet at Alexandretta
1297 – Admission to the Maggior Consiglio  – the Great Council of Venice – is restricted for the first time on 28 February
1298 – Marco Polo is taken prisoner during the Battle of Curzola by Genoa
1299 – Pietro Gradenigo sends a fleet of 100 ships to attack the Genoese

14th century
1304 – Salt War with Padua
1310 – 14 June – Plot by Baiamonte Tiepolo and Marco Querini is quelled. The Consiglio dei Dieci – the Council of Ten – is set up to try the culprits
1311 – Marino Zorzi is elected Doge
1312 – Giovanni Soranzo is elected Doge
1328 – Francesco Dandolo is elected Doge
1337 – Serrvalle is acquired
1339
Bartolomeo Gradenigo is elected Doge
Treviso is taken from the Scaligeri
Bassano del Grappa is acquired
1342 – Andrea Dandolo is elected Doge
1345 – Siege of Zadar begins and lasts until 1346. It was successful.
1348 – The Black Plague begins to spread in Venice killing half of the population
1350 – Third war with Genoa breaks out and lasts until 1355. Venice allies with the Byzantines and the Pisans
1354 – Marino Faliero is elected Doge and convicted of treason after a failed attempt to overthrow Republican Rule on 17 April. He is executed and condemned to damnatio memoriae
1355 – Giovanni Gradenigo is elected Doge
1356 – Giovanni Dolfin is elected Doge
1361 – Lorenzo Celsi is elected Doge
1363 – A colonial revolt breaks out in Crete that needed considerable military force and five years to suppress
1365 – Marco Cornaro is elected Doge
1367 – Andrea Contarini is elected Doge
1368 – The War of Trieste begins in order to secure Adriatic trade routes.  The war ends in 1370
1378 – Outbreak of the fourth and final Venetian–Genoese War, the "War of Chioggia", which lasts until 1381
1380 
 The Venetians destroy the Genoese fleet at the Battle of Chioggia
 Oderzo is acquired
1381 – End of the War of Chioggia with the Peace of Turin on 8 August
1382 – Michele Morosini is elected Doge
1382 – Antonio Venier is elected Doge
1388 – Treviso passes into permanent Venetian control
1389 – December 19 – Episcopal County of Ceneda which includes Conegliano peacefully submits to Venetian overlordship

15th century
1400 – Michele Steno is elected Doge
1404 – Venice extends its rule over Vicenza, Belluno, and Feltre
1405 – Venice acquires Vicenza, Verona, Padua, and Este
1409 – Ladislaus of Naples sells his "rights" on Dalmatia to the Republic of Venice for 100,000 ducats. Dalmatia will with some interruptions remain under Venetian rule for nearly four centuries, until 1797.
1410 – Venice has a navy of 3,300 ships (manned by 36,000 men) and has taken over most of Venetia, including such important cities as Verona and Padua
1413 – Tommaso Mocenigo is elected Doge
1420 
 Venice conquers the Patriarchate of Aquileia
 Traù, Spalato, Durazzo and other Dalmatian cities are acquired
1423 
 Francesco Foscari is elected Doge
 August – The Treaty of Sveti Srdj ends the Second Scutari War with the Serbian Despotate
1425 – War breaks out against Filippo Maria Visconti of Milan
1426 
 Treaty of Vučitrn confirms arrangements ending the Second Scutari War
 Brescia becomes a Venetian possession
1428 – Bergamo becomes a Venetian possession
1446 – The Republic fights another league, formed by Milan, Florence, Bologna and Cremona
1453: May 29 – Constantinople falls to the Ottoman Turks, but Venice manages to maintain a colony in the city and some of the former trade privileges it had under the Byzantines
1454
 The Ottoman Turks grant the Venetians access to their ports and trading rights
 The Peace of Lodi confirms Venetian rule as far as the Adda (river)
1457 – Pasquale Malipiero is elected Doge after Doge Francesco Foscari is forced to abdicate by the Council of Ten
1462 – Cristoforo Moro is elected Doge
1463 – Outbreak of the First Ottoman–Venetian War (1463–79)
1471 – Nicolo Tron is elected Doge
1473 – Nicolo Marcello is elected Doge
1474 – Pietro Mocenigo is elected Doge
1476 – Andrea Vendramin is elected Doge
1478 – Giovanni Mocenigo is elected Doge
1479 – January 24: Treaty of Constantinople is signed, finally making peace with the Ottoman Turks. Venice has to cede Argos, Negroponte, Lemnos and Scutari, and pay an annual tribute of 10,000 gold ducats. In September, painter Gentile Bellini is sent by the Senate to the new Ottoman capital, Constantinople, as a cultural ambassador
1481 Venice retakes Rovigo which it had held previously from 1395–1438
1482 – Venice allied with Pope Sixtus IV in his attempt to conquer Ferrara, opposed to Florence, Naples, Milan and Ercole d'Este
1484 – The treaty of peace between Venice and the Ottoman Turks is confirmed by Mehmed II's successor, Bayezid II, with the pacific exchange of the islands of Zakynthos and Kefalonia between the two states
1485 – Marco Barbarigo is elected Doge
1486 – Agostino Barbarigo is elected Doge
1488 – Portuguese explorer Bartolomeu Dias rounds the Cape of Good Hope, providing europeans with a direct all-sea route to the Indian Ocean
1489 – February -Catherine Cornaro, widow of the last king, James II, willingly cedes Cyprus to Venice
1492 – Christopher Columbus discovers the Americas; the major European trade centers begin to shift away from the Mediterranean
1495 – In exchange of the financial support provided by the Republic to the Kingdom of Naples against France, Venice receives from Ferdinand II of Naples some ports on the coast of Apulia: Trani, Mola di Bari (where the castle remains unconquered), Monopoli, Brindisi, Otranto, Gallipoli.
1498 – arrival of Vasco da Gama of Portugal in India, destroying Venice's land route monopoly over the Eastern trade
1499 – Venice allies itself with Louis XII of France against Milan, gaining Cremona. **Outbreak of the Second Ottoman–Venetian War, when the Ottoman sultan moves to attack Lepanto. The Venetian fleet under Antonio Grimani, more a businessman and diplomat than a sailor, is defeated by the Ottoman navy in the Battle of Zonchio

16th century
1501 – Leonardo Loredan is elected Doge
1508 – Eager to take some of Venice's lands, all neighbouring powers join in the League of Cambrai under the leadership of Pope Julius II
1509 – Venice is engaged in various military endeavors
14 May: Venice is crushingly defeated at the Battle of Agnadello, in the Ghiara d'Adda, marking one of the most delicate points of Venetian history. French and imperial troops were occupying the Veneto, but Venice manages to extricate herself through diplomatic efforts
July: Andrea Gritti recaptures Padua, successfully defending it against the besieging imperial troops. Spain and the Pope break off their alliance with France, and Venice regains Brescia and Verona from France
1515 – Venice forms an alliance with France and defeats the imperial and Swiss soldiers in the battle of Marignano
1514: 10 January – Great fire in the Rialto
1516 – Venetian Ghetto instituted
1521 – Antonio Grimani is elected Doge
1523 – Andrea Gritti is elected Doge
1530 – End of the Venetian domination in Apulian ports in Mola di Bari, Monopoli, Trani, Brindisi, Otranto e Gallipoli, Apulia.
1537 – Outbreak of the Third Ottoman–Venetian War, which lasts until 1540. The Ottomans unsuccessfully besiege Corfu
1538 – Pietro Lando is elected Doge
1545 – Francesco Donato is elected Doge
1553 – Marcantonio Trivisan is elected Doge
1554 – Francesco Venier is elected Doge
1556 – Lorenzo Priuli is elected Doge
1559 – Girolamo Priuli is elected Doge
1563 – The population of Venice has dropped to about 168,000 people
1567 – Pietro Loredan is elected Doge
1569
Five banks fail
13/14 September – Arsenale fire
1570 – Alvise I Mocenigo is elected Doge. Outbreak of the Fourth Ottoman–Venetian War (1570–73), when the Ottomans attack Cyprus. Formation of the Holy League including Venice, Spain and the Papacy
1571
1 August – Famagusta is surrendered to the Ottomans. The Venetian defender Marco Antonio Bragadin is subsequently flayed alive
7 October – The Christian fleet defeats the Turks at the Battle of Lepanto but the allies fail to take advantage of their victory
1573 – The loss of Cyprus is ratified in the peace of 1573
1575 – The population of Venice is about 175,000 people
1575–1577 – Bubonic plague strikes Venice, killing around 25% of the population
1577 – Sebastiano Venier is elected Doge
1578 – Nicolò da Ponte is elected Doge
1581 – The population of Venice is down to about 124,000 people
1585 – Pasqual Cicogna is elected Doge
1588: 9 June – The first stone of the Rialto Bridge is laid
1591 – The Rialto Bridge is completed
1595 – Marino Grimani is elected Doge

17th century
1605 – Conflict between Venice and the Holy See begins with the arrest of two members of the clergy guilty of petty crimes, and with a law restricting the Church's right to enjoy and acquire landed property
1606
Anti-clericalist Leonardo Donato is elected Doge
Venetian Interdict imposed
1607 – Venetian Interdict lifted due to intercession with the Pope by France
1609 – Galileo Galilei presents a telescope to Venice
1612 – Marcantonio Memmo is elected Doge
1615
Giovanni Bembo is elected Doge
War of Gradisca against Uskok pirates begins, continuing until 1617
1617 – The Spanish viceroy of Naples attempts to break Venetian dominance by sending a naval squadron to the Adriatic and fails
1618
Nicolò Donato is elected Doge
Antonio Priuli is elected Doge
1623 – Francesco Contarini is elected Doge
1624 – Giovanni I Cornaro is elected Doge
1630
Nicolò Contarini is elected Doge
Plague breaks out in Venice
1631
Francesco Erizzo is elected Doge
The plague ends in Venice with 50,000 dead – nearly a third of the population. As a votive offering for the city's deliverance from the pestilence, Venice builds a church to Our Lady of Health (Santa Maria della Salute)
1638 – While the Venetian fleet is cruising off Crete, a corsair fleet from Barbary consisting of 16 galleys from Algiers and Tunis enters the Adriatic
1645 – Beginning of the Cretan War (1645–69) (Candian War) between Venice and the Ottoman Turks. Although Venice is generally superior at sea, its forces are unable to prevent the Turks from landing in and conquering much of Crete, nor of dislodging them after
1646 – Francesco Molin is elected Doge
1647: August–September – The Ottomans lay siege to Sebenico (now Šibenik, Croatia), but fail to take it
1648 – During the Cretan War, Venetian commander Leonardo Foscolo seizes several forts in Dalamtia, retakes Novigrad, temporarily captures the Knin Fortress, and manages to compel the garrison of Klis Fortress to surrender.
1655 – Carlo Contarini is elected Doge
1656
Francesco Cornaro is elected Doge
Bertuccio Valiero is elected Doge
1658 – Giovanni Pesaro is elected Doge
1659 – Domenico II Contarini is elected Doge
1666 – An expedition to retake Chania fails
1669 – An attempt to lift the siege of Candia with joint action on land with the French contingent and by sea under Mocenigo fails. End of the Cretan War (1645–69) with Venice losing Crete
1674 – Nicolò Sagredo is elected Doge
1676 – Alvise Contarini is elected Doge
1683 – Marcantonio Giustinian is elected Doge
1684 – Venice, taking advance of the recent Turkish defeat in the siege of Vienna, forms an alliance with Austria against the Ottoman Turks. Beginning of the Morean War, a part of the Great Turkish War, which lasts until 1699
1688 
 Francesco Morosini is elected Doge
 Morosini fails to capture Negroponte
1694 – Silvestro Valiero is elected Doge
1699 – The Great Turkish War ends with the Treaty of Karlowitz. Venice makes extensive territorial gains in southern Greece

18th century
1700 – Alvise II Mocenigo is elected Doge
1709 – Giovanni II Cornaro is elected Doge
1714 – December: the Ottoman Turks declared war on Venice, the seventh and last conflict between the two powers.
1715 – A huge Ottoman army under Grand Vizier Silahdar Damat Ali Pasha overruns the Morea
1716 – Successful defense against Ottoman siege of Corfu. Austrian intervention takes off pressure from the Venetians, but they are unable to retake their lost possessions
1717 – Performance of Juditha Triumphans an oratorio of Antonio Vivaldi commissioned by the Republic to celebrate allegorically the defense of Corfu
1718: 21 July – The Treaty of Passarowitz – Austria makes large territorial gains, but Venice loses the Morea, for which her small gains in Albania and Dalmatia, where the Venetians are able to advance up to the modern-day Bosnian/Croatian border, taking in the whole Sinjsko Polje and Imotski, are little compensation
1722 – Sebastiano Mocenigo is elected Doge
1732 – Carlo Ruzzini is elected Doge
1735 – Alvise Pisani is elected Doge
1741 – Pietro Grimani is elected Doge
1744 – Work begins at the Lido on construction of the murazzi breakwater to protect the lagoon from sea storms
1752 – Francesco Loredan is elected Doge
1762 – Marco Foscarini is elected Doge
1763 – Alvise Giovanni Mocenigo is elected Doge
1779 – Paolo Renier is elected Doge
1782 – Pope Pius VI visits Venice along with several princes of Russia
1785 – Angelo Emo begins an expedition to northern Africa against the Barbary pirates.  His expedition will end in 1786
1789 – Ludovico Manin is elected Doge. He will ultimately be the last Doge of the Republic of Venice
1796 – Prelude to the Fall of the Republic
The Republic of Venice can no longer defend itself since its war fleet numbers only 4 galleys and 7 galliots
French troops occupy the Venetian state up to the Adige. Vicenza, Cadore and Friuli are held by the Austrians
1797 – The Fall of the Republic
April 9 – Napoleon threatens Venice with war
May 1 – Domenico Pizzamano fires on a French ship trying to force an entry from the Lido forts. Napoleon declares war
May 12 – The Maggior Consiglio  – the Great Council of Venice – sits for the last time and approves a motion to hand over power "to the system of the proposed provisional representative government", although there is not a quorum of votes: 512 vote for, ten against, and five abstain
May 16 – The provisional municipal government meets in the Hall of the Maggior Consiglio. The preliminaries of the Peace of Leoben are made even harsher in the Treaty of Campoformio, and Venice and all her possessions become Austrian
October 18 – The accord is signed at Passariano, forcing Ludovico Manin to abdicate and thus ending the Republic of Venice after more than a thousand years

See also 

 Republic of Venice
 Doge of Venice
 Timeline of Venice (city)
 Historical states of Italy
 Wars in Lombardy
 History of Byzantine Empire
 Patriarchate of Aquileia
 Ottoman wars in Europe
 Italian Wars
 Marco Polo
 Napoleonic Wars
 Timeline of Brescia 1426–1797
 Timeline of Padua, 1405–1797
 Timeline of Verona, 1405–1796
 Treaty of Campoformio
 History of Friuli
 Venetian Slovenia
 Venetian Albania

References

Further reading

 

Republic of Venice
Republic of Venice
Republic of Venice-related lists